The 2010 MAC Championship Game was played at 7:00 p.m. on Friday, December 3, 2010, at Ford Field in Detroit, Michigan to determine the 2010 football champion of the Mid-American Conference (MAC).  The game featured the Miami University Redhawks and the Northern Illinois Huskies.

Miami defeated Northern Illinois 26-21 on a 33-yard pass from Austin Boucher to Armand Robinson for a touchdown with 33 seconds remaining in regulation. The game lasted 3 hours and 12 minutes.

Scoring
First Quarter
 Miami — Thomas Merriweather scored on a 1-yard run to give MU-Ohio 6 point lead (Northern Illinois 0 - Miami 6)
 Northern Illinois — Martel Moore caught a 69-yard pass from Chand Harnish (Northern Illinois 7 - Miami 6)
 Miami — Tracy Woods ran for 7 yards for a touchdown (Northern Illinois 7 - Miami 13)
 Northern Illinois — Chand Harnish passed to Martel Moore for a 27-yard touchdown (Northern Illinois 14 - Miami 13)
Third Quarter
 Miami — T. Merriweather ran for 1-yard touchdown (Northern Illinois 14 - Miami 20)
Fourth Quarter
 Northern Illinois — Willie Clark caught a 39-yard pass from Harnish (Northern Illinois 21 - Miami 20)
 Miami — Austin Boucher passed to Armand Robinson for 33 yards (Northern Illinois 21 - Miami 26)

References

Championship Game
MAC Championship Game
Miami RedHawks football games
Northern Illinois Huskies football games
American football competitions in Detroit
MAC Championship Game
MAC Championship
MAC Championship Game